Barathrites parri is a species of cusk-eel native to the north-western Atlantic.

References 

Ophidiidae
Animals described in 1957